The William W. Kimball House is a private residence located at 1801 Prairie Avenue in the Near South Side neighborhood of Chicago, Illinois. It was added to the National Register of Historic Places on December 9, 1971.

History
The house was built in 1890–1892 for William Wallace Kimball, a piano manufacturer. Kimball reportedly spent $1 million on the home. At the time, Prairie Avenue was known for its expensive homes designed in popular revival styles, and the district was home to many of Chicago's wealthiest residents. The Kimball House and the John J. Glessner House are the main two surviving examples of the district's homes of the late 1800s. The house now serves as the headquarters of the United States Soccer Federation.

Architecture
The Kimball house was designed by architect Solon Spencer Beman in the Châteauesque style. The house's design features a number of turrets with a variety of roof shapes, a limestone exterior, and an elliptical bow window topped by an ornamented gable facing Prairie Avenue. The design is considered a significant example of the Châteauesque style by architectural historians; John Drury called the house "Chicago's best Châteauesque design" in 1941, and Marcus Whiffen cited the house as a representative example of Châteauesque architecture in America.

References

Houses completed in 1892
Houses on the National Register of Historic Places in Chicago
United States Soccer Federation
Gilded Age mansions